Braine is a surname. Notable people with the surname include:

Raymond Braine (1907–1978), Belgian footballer
Pierre Braine (1900–1951), Belgian footballer
Bernard Braine (1914–2000), British politician
John Braine (1922–1986), English novelist
Martin Braine (1926–1996), British, American psychologist
David Braine (philosopher) (born 1940), British philosopher
David Braine (athletic director) (born 1943), athletic director
Richard Braine (actor) (born 1956), British actor
Richard Braine (politician) (born 1968), British politician, leader of the UK Independence Party (UKIP)
Daniel L. Braine (1829–1898), American naval admiral
Jehan de Braine (c. 1200–1240), Count of Macon and Vienne
Robert Braine (1896–1940), American composer